Anuschka is a 1942 German historical drama film directed by Helmut Käutner and starring Hilde Krahl, Siegfried Breuer and Friedl Czepa.

The film's sets were designed by the art director Ludwig Reiber. It was shot at the Barrandov Studios in Prague and Cinecitta in Rome. Location filming took place in Carinthia.

Cast

References

External links

Anuschka Full movie with English subtitles at Deutsche Filmothek

Films of Nazi Germany
Films directed by Helmut Käutner
Films set in Vienna
Films set in Austria
Films set in the 1890s
German historical drama films
1940s historical drama films
Bavaria Film films
Films shot at Barrandov Studios
German black-and-white films
1940s German-language films
1940s German films